Sibianor is a genus of jumping spiders that was first described by D. V. Logunov in 2001. They are closely related to Bianor.

Species
 it contains fifteen species, found in Europe, Asia, Africa, Canada, and the United States:
Sibianor aemulus (Gertsch, 1934) – USA, Canada
Sibianor anansii Logunov, 2009 – Botswana
Sibianor annae Logunov, 2001 – China
Sibianor aurocinctus (Ohlert, 1865) (type) – Europe, Turkey, Caucasus, Russia (Europe to South Siberia), Kazakhstan, China, Korea, Japan
Sibianor japonicus (Logunov, Ikeda & Ono, 1997) – Russia (Far East), Japan
Sibianor kenyaensis Logunov, 2001 – Botswana, Kenya
Sibianor kochiensis (Bohdanowicz & Prószyński, 1987) – Japan
Sibianor larae Logunov, 2001 – Europe, Russia (Europe to Far East)
Sibianor latens (Logunov, 1991) – Russia (South Siberia to Far East), China
Sibianor nigriculus (Logunov & Wesolowska, 1992) – Russia (Far East), Korea, Japan
Sibianor proszynski (Zhu & Song, 2001) – China
Sibianor pullus (Bösenberg & Strand, 1906) – Russia (Far East), China, Korea, Japan
Sibianor tantulus (Simon, 1868) – Europe, Russia (Europe to Far East), Georgia, Mongolia
Sibianor turkestanicus Logunov, 2001 – Azerbaijan, Kyrgyzstan
Sibianor victoriae Logunov, 2001 – Kenya, South Africa

References

External links
 Photograph of S. aurocinctus

Salticidae
Salticidae genera
Spiders of Africa
Spiders of Asia
Spiders of North America